An "it girl" is an attractive young woman, who is perceived to have both sex appeal and a personality that is especially engaging.

The expression it girl originated in British upper-class society around the turn of the 20th century. It gained further attention in 1927 with the popularity of the Paramount Studios film It, starring Clara Bow. In the earlier usage, a woman was especially perceived as an "it girl" if she had achieved a high level of popularity without flaunting her sexuality. Today, the term is used more to apply simply to fame and beauty. The Oxford English Dictionary distinguishes between the chiefly American usage of "a glamorous, vivacious, or sexually attractive actress, model, etc.", and the chiefly British usage of "a young, rich woman who has achieved celebrity because of her socialite lifestyle". The terms "it boy" or "it man" are sometimes used to describe a male exhibiting similar traits.

Early use 

An early literary usage of it in this sense is found in a 1904 short story by Rudyard Kipling, which contains the line "'Tisn't beauty, so to speak, nor good talk necessarily. It's just It. Some women'll stay in a man's memory if they once walk down a street."

Elinor Glyn, the notorious British novelist who wrote the book titled It and its subsequent screenplay, lectured:

Glyn first rose to fame as the author of the scandalous 1907 bestseller Three Weeks. She is widely credited with the invention of the "it girl" concept: although the slang predates her book and film, she was responsible for the term's impact on the culture of the 1920s.

Clara Bow later said she wasn't sure what "it" meant, although she identified Lana Turner and later Marilyn Monroe as "it girls".

The fashion component of the "it girl" originated with Glyn's elder sister, couturier Lucy, Lady Duff-Gordon, known professionally as "Lucile". Lucile managed exclusive salons in London, Paris and New York, was the first designer to present her collections on a stage complete with the theatrical accoutrements of lights and music (inspiring the modern runway or catwalk show), and was famous for making sexuality an aspect of fashion through her provocative lingerie and lingerie-inspired clothes. She also specialised in dressing trendsetting stage and film performers, ranging from the stars of the Ziegfeld Follies on Broadway to silent screen icons such as Mary Pickford and Irene Castle.

As early as 1917, Lucile herself used the term "it" in relation to style in her fashion column for Harper's Bazaar: "... I saw a very ladylike and well-bred friend of mine in her newest Parisian frock ... she felt she was 'it' and perfectly happy."

"It" (1927 film) 
The Paramount Studios film was planned as a special showcase for its popular star Clara Bow, and her performance introduced the term "it" to the cultural lexicon. The film plays with the notion that "it" is a quality which eschews definitions and categories; consequently, the girl portrayed by Bow is an amalgam of an ingenue and a femme fatale, with a touch of Madonna's latter day "Material Girl" incarnation. By contrast, Bow's rival in the script is equally young and comely (and rich and well-bred to boot), yet she doesn't have "It".

Modern "it girls" 
Since the 1980s, the term "it girl" has been used slightly differently, referring to a wealthy, normally unemployed, young woman who is pictured in tabloids going to many parties often in the company of other celebrities, receiving media coverage in spite of no real personal achievements or TV hosting / presenting. The writer William Donaldson observed that, having initially been coined in the 1920s, the term was applied in the 1990s to describe "a young woman of noticeable 'sex appeal' who occupied herself by shoe shopping and party-going".

The prominence of an "it girl" is often temporary; some of the rising "it girls" will either become fully-fledged celebrities, commonly initially via appearances on reality TV shows or series; lacking such an accelerant, their popularity will normally fade.

Examples 
 Evelyn Nesbit (1884 or 1885–1967), American artists' model, photographic model, chorus girl, and silent film actress, whose rise to fame around 1900 has been called "the birth of the 'It Girl'".
 Edie Sedgwick (1943–1971), American actress, model, and Andy Warhol's muse, was dubbed "the it girl".
 Michelle Yeoh (b. 1962), Malaysian actress, is considered an "it girl" by GQ.
Tamara Beckwith (b. 1970), English socialite and television personality, was widely described as an "it girl" in the 1990s.
 Tara Palmer-Tomkinson (1971–2017), English socialite and television personality, was considered to be the foremost of the 1990s "it girls" in the United Kingdom.
 Chloë Sevigny (b. 1974), American actress and model, was described as an "it girl" by Jay McInerney in The New Yorker in 1994, because of her status as a fashion impresario.
 Fan Bingbing (b. 1981), Chinese actress, is considered an "it girl" by The Hollywood Reporter.
 Nidhi Sunil (b. 1987), Indian actress, is considered an "it girl" by the South China Morning Post.
 Sara Schätzl (b. 1987), German writer and actress, was labelled an "it girl" by the German tabloid press in the late 2000s.
Jessi (b. 1988), Korean-American rapper, singer and songwriter, is considered an "it girl" by Elle Singapore.
Rola (b. 1990), Japanese model and actress, is considered an "it girl" by The Japan Times.
Karishma Sharma (b. 1993), Indian actress, is considered an "it girl" by Man's World.
HoYeon Jung (b. 1994), Korean actress, is considered an "it girl" by Vulture.
Jisoo (b. 1995), Jennie (b. 1996), Rosé (b 1997), and Lisa (b. 1997), singers of South Korean K-pop group Blackpink, are considered "it girl[s]" by Elle India, L'Officiel, and Vogue Hong Kong respectively.
Olivia Rodrigo (b. 2003), American singer, is considered an "it girl" by The Hollywood Reporter.
Le Sserafim, Korean K-pop group, was called an "it girl group" by Allure

Gallery

Film and theater 
 Glyn's 1927 film script was adapted into a musical called The It Girl, which opened off-Broadway in 2001 at the York Theatre Company, starring Jean Louisa Kelly.
 It Girls is a 2002 feature documentary film directed by Robin Melanie Leacock, which chronicles the activities of a group of socialites in Manhattan, New York, U.S., during New York Fashion Week.

"It boy" or "it man" 
The terms "it boy" or "it man" have been used to describe a male exhibiting similar qualities to an "it girl". In 1950, Bow identified Robert Mitchum as an "it man". In 1995, Entertainment Weekly referred to Leonardo DiCaprio as "Hollywood's 'It' Boy" because of his "blazing talent and dashing baby-faced looks – a combination of the mystic and the mischievous – that have the praise faucets gushing buckets". South Korean boy-band BTS was called an "It boy" band by Billboard in 2017. In 2018, Vanity Fair referred to Timothée Chalamet as an "It Boy". Jimin, a member of BTS, was called an "it boy" in 2019.

Gallery

See also 
 Gibson Girl
 15 minutes of fame
 Famous for being famous
 International Debutante Ball
 It bag
 Sex symbol
 Sexual capital
 Socialite
 Allegra Coleman (fictional "it girl")

References

Notes

Further reading 
Bigham, Randy Bryan. (2012). Lucile: Her Life by Design
Brown, Leah Marie. (2015, 2016, 2017). The It Girls series. Book one: Faking It ; Book two: Finding It ; Book three: Working It ; Book four: Owning It 

 

Celebrity fandom
Stereotypes of women
1900s neologisms
Social influence